Tethea longisigna is a moth in the family Drepanidae first described by Gyula M. László, Gábor Ronkay, László Aladár Ronkay and Thomas Joseph Witt in 2007. It is found in the Chinese provinces of Heilongjiang, Shaanxi, Gansu, Xinjiang, Hubei, Zhejiang, Fujian, Sichuan and Yunnan.

References

Moths described in 2007
Thyatirinae